This page is a list of 2013 UCI ProTeams and riders. These teams competed in the 2013 UCI World Tour.

Teams overview 
The 19 ProTeams in 2013 were:

 were promoted up to the top division of teams for this season, whilst  were somewhat controversially removed from the World Tour peloton. On 15 February 2013 the Court of Arbitration for Sport upheld 's appeal against the UCI's decision not to issue them a World Tour licence. On 18 February 2013 the UCI announced that, contrary to previous assertions, 19 teams would hold ProTeam status for this season.

Ahead of the Tour de France, Belkin acquired title sponsorship, with the team becoming .

Riders







































Notes

References

See also 

 2013 in men's road cycling
 List of 2013 UCI Professional Continental and Continental teams
 List of 2013 UCI Women's Teams

2013 in men's road cycling
2013